This is a list, not yet complete, of churches in Paris classified by the French Ministry of Culture as national historic monuments, They are listed by date of founding and architectural style, though many have features from several different periods.

Romanesque and Gothic

Renaissance, Baroque  and Classical (Late 15th- 18th century)

Neoclassical, Neo-Gothic, Neo-Byzantine and Art Deco (19th- 20th century)

Notes and citations

Bibliography (in French) 
 
Dumoulin, Aline; Ardisson, Alexandra; Maingard, Jérôme; Antonello, Murielle; Églises de Paris (2010), Éditions Massin, Issy-Les-Moulineaux, 
Lecompte, Francis and Ladoux, Bernard, "Paris Rive Gauche – Quartier Latin, St, Germain des Prés, Montparnasse – Les Essentials du Patrimoine", Éditions Massin, Paris,

See also 
List of monuments historiques in Paris
List of religious buildings in Paris

External links 

Historic buildings in Paris by arrondissement
 Catholic churches in Paris
Information on top churches in Paris

Paris
Paris-related lists